This is a list of the mammal species recorded in Guinea. Of the mammal species in Guinea, one is critically endangered, ten are endangered, eleven are vulnerable, and nine are near threatened.

The following tags are used to highlight each species' conservation status as assessed by the International Union for Conservation of Nature:

Some species were assessed using an earlier set of criteria. Species assessed using this system have the following instead of near threatened and least concern categories:

Order: Afrosoricida (tenrecs and golden moles) 

The order Afrosoricida contains the golden moles of southern Africa and the tenrecs of Madagascar and Africa, two families of small mammals that were traditionally part of the order Insectivora.

Family: Tenrecidae (tenrecs)
Subfamily: Potamogalinae
Genus: Micropotamogale
 Nimba otter shrew, Micropotamogale lamottei EN

Order: Hyracoidea (hyraxes) 

The hyraxes are any of four species of fairly small, thickset, herbivorous mammals in the order Hyracoidea. About the size of a domestic cat they are well-furred, with rounded bodies and a stumpy tail. They are native to Africa and the Middle East.

Family: Procaviidae (hyraxes)
Genus: Dendrohyrax
 Western tree hyrax, Dendrohyrax dorsalis LC
Genus: Procavia
 Cape hyrax, Procavia capensis LC

Order: Proboscidea (elephants) 

The elephants comprise three living species and are the largest living land animals.

Family: Elephantidae (elephants)
Genus: Loxodonta
African forest elephant, L. cyclotis

Order: Sirenia (manatees and dugongs) 

Sirenia is an order of fully aquatic, herbivorous mammals that inhabit rivers, estuaries, coastal marine waters, swamps, and marine wetlands. All four species are endangered.

Family: Trichechidae
Genus: Trichechus
 African manatee, Trichechus senegalensis VU

Order: Primates 

The order Primates contains humans and their closest relatives: lemurs, lorisoids, tarsiers, monkeys, and apes.

Suborder: Strepsirrhini
Infraorder: Lemuriformes
Superfamily: Lorisoidea
Family: Lorisidae (lorises, bushbabies)
Genus: Perodicticus
 Potto, Perodicticus potto LR/lc
Family: Galagidae
Genus: Galagoides
 Prince Demidoff's bushbaby, Galagoides demidovii LR/lc
Genus: Galago
 Senegal bushbaby, Galago senegalensis LR/lc
Suborder: Haplorhini
Infraorder: Simiiformes
Parvorder: Catarrhini
Superfamily: Cercopithecoidea
Family: Cercopithecidae (Old World monkeys)
Genus: Erythrocebus
 Patas monkey, Erythrocebus patas LR/lc
Genus: Chlorocebus
 Green monkey, Chlorocebus sabaeus LR/lc
Genus: Cercopithecus
 Campbell's mona monkey, Cercopithecus campbelli LR/lc
 Diana monkey, Cercopithecus diana EN
 Lesser spot-nosed monkey, Cercopithecus petaurista LR/lc
Genus: Papio
 Olive baboon, Papio anubis LR/lc
 Guinea baboon, Papio papio LR/nt
Genus: Cercocebus
 Sooty mangabey, Cercocebus atys LR/nt
 Collared mangabey, Cercocebus torquatus LR/nt
Subfamily: Colobinae
Genus: Colobus
 King colobus, Colobus polykomos LR/nt
Genus: Procolobus
 Red colobus, Procolobus badius EN
 Olive colobus, Procolobus verus LR/nt
Superfamily: Hominoidea
Family: Hominidae (great apes)
Subfamily: Homininae
Tribe: Panini
Genus: Pan
 Common chimpanzee, Pan troglodytes EN

Order: Rodentia (rodents) 

Rodents make up the largest order of mammals, with over 40% of mammalian species. They have two incisors in the upper and lower jaw which grow continually and must be kept short by gnawing.

Suborder: Hystricognathi
Family: Hystricidae (Old World porcupines)
Genus: Atherurus
 African brush-tailed porcupine, Atherurus africanus LC
Family: Thryonomyidae (cane rats)
Genus: Thryonomys
 Greater cane rat, Thryonomys swinderianus LC
Suborder: Sciurognathi
Family: Anomaluridae
Subfamily: Anomalurinae
Genus: Anomalurops
 Beecroft's scaly-tailed squirrel, Anomalurops beecrofti LC
Family: Sciuridae (squirrels)
Subfamily: Xerinae
Tribe: Xerini
Genus: Xerus
 Striped ground squirrel, Xerus erythropus LC
Tribe: Protoxerini
Genus: Funisciurus
 Fire-footed rope squirrel, Funisciurus pyrropus LC
Genus: Heliosciurus
 Gambian sun squirrel, Heliosciurus gambianus LC
 Small sun squirrel, Heliosciurus punctatus DD
 Red-legged sun squirrel, Heliosciurus rufobrachium LC
Genus: Paraxerus
 Green bush squirrel, Paraxerus poensis LC
Family: Nesomyidae
Subfamily: Dendromurinae
Genus: Dendromus
 Gray climbing mouse, Dendromus melanotis LC
Subfamily: Cricetomyinae
Genus: Cricetomys
 Emin's pouched rat, Cricetomys emini LC
 Gambian pouched rat, Cricetomys gambianus LC
Family: Muridae (mice, rats, voles, gerbils, hamsters, etc.)
Subfamily: Deomyinae
Genus: Lophuromys
 Rusty-bellied brush-furred rat, Lophuromys sikapusi LC
Genus: Uranomys
 Rudd's mouse, Uranomys ruddi LC
Subfamily: Gerbillinae
Genus: Tatera
 Guinean gerbil, Tatera guineae LC
 Kemp's gerbil, Tatera kempi LC
Genus: Taterillus
 Gracile tateril, Taterillus gracilis LC
Subfamily: Murinae
Genus: Arvicanthis
 Sudanian grass rat, Arvicanthis ansorgei LC
 Guinean grass rat, Arvicanthis rufinus LC
Genus: Dasymys
 West African shaggy rat, Dasymys rufulus LC
Genus: Dephomys
 Defua rat, Dephomys defua LC
Genus: Grammomys
 Bunting's thicket rat, Grammomys buntingi DD
 Shining thicket rat, Grammomys rutilans LC
Genus: Hybomys
 Miller's striped mouse, Hybomys planifrons LC
 Temminck's striped mouse, Hybomys trivirgatus LC
Genus: Hylomyscus
 Allen's wood mouse, Hylomyscus alleni LC
Genus: Lemniscomys
 Bellier's striped grass mouse, Lemniscomys bellieri LC
 Senegal one-striped grass mouse, Lemniscomys linulus DD
 Typical striped grass mouse, Lemniscomys striatus LC
 Heuglin's striped grass mouse, Lemniscomys zebra LC
Genus: Malacomys
 Edward's swamp rat, Malacomys edwardsi LC
Genus: Mastomys
 Guinea multimammate mouse, Mastomys erythroleucus LC
 Hubert's multimammate mouse, Mastomys huberti LC
 Natal multimammate mouse, Mastomys natalensis LC
Genus: Mus
 Baoule's mouse, Mus baoulei LC
 Matthey's mouse, Mus mattheyi LC
 African pygmy mouse, Mus minutoides LC
 Peters's mouse, Mus setulosus LC
Genus: Mylomys
 African groove-toothed rat, Mylomys dybowskii LC
Genus: Oenomys
 Ghana rufous-nosed rat, Oenomys ornatus DD
Genus: Praomys
 Dalton's mouse, Praomys daltoni LC
 Jackson's soft-furred mouse, Praomys jacksoni LC
 Forest soft-furred mouse, Praomys rostratus LC
 Tullberg's soft-furred mouse, Praomys tullbergi LC

Order: Lagomorpha (lagomorphs) 

The lagomorphs comprise two families, Leporidae (hares and rabbits), and Ochotonidae (pikas). Though they can resemble rodents, and were classified as a superfamily in that order until the early 20th century, they have since been considered a separate order. They differ from rodents in a number of physical characteristics, such as having four incisors in the upper jaw rather than two.

Family: Leporidae (rabbits, hares)
Genus: Lepus
 Cape hare, Lepus capensis LR/lc
 African savanna hare, Lepus microtis LR/lc

Order: Erinaceomorpha (hedgehogs and gymnures) 

The order Erinaceomorpha contains a single family, Erinaceidae, which comprise the hedgehogs and gymnures. The hedgehogs are easily recognised by their spines while gymnures look more like large rats.

Family: Erinaceidae (hedgehogs)
Subfamily: Erinaceinae
Genus: Atelerix
 Four-toed hedgehog, Atelerix albiventris LR/lc

Order: Soricomorpha (shrews, moles, and solenodons) 

The "shrew-forms" are insectivorous mammals. The shrews and solenodons closely resemble mice while the moles are stout-bodied burrowers.

Family: Soricidae (shrews)
Subfamily: Crocidurinae
Genus: Crocidura
 Buettikofer's shrew, Crocidura buettikoferi LC
 Crosse's shrew, Crocidura crossei LC
 Dent's shrew, Crocidura denti LC
 Fox's shrew, Crocidura foxi LC
 Bicolored musk shrew, Crocidura fuscomurina LC
 Large-headed shrew, Crocidura grandiceps NT
 Grasse's shrew, Crocidura grassei LC
 Lamotte's shrew, Crocidura lamottei LC
 Mauritanian shrew, Crocidura lusitania LC
 West African long-tailed shrew, Crocidura muricauda LC
 Savanna dwarf shrew, Crocidura nanilla LC
 Nimba shrew, Crocidura nimbae VU
 West African pygmy shrew, Crocidura obscurior LC
 Fraser's musk shrew, Crocidura poensis LC
 Therese's shrew, Crocidura theresae LC
Genus: Sylvisorex
 Climbing shrew, Sylvisorex megalura LC

Order: Chiroptera (bats) 

The bats' most distinguishing feature is that their forelimbs are developed as wings, making them the only mammals capable of flight. Bat species account for about 20% of all mammals.

Family: Pteropodidae (flying foxes, Old World fruit bats)
Subfamily: Pteropodinae
Genus: Eidolon
 Straw-coloured fruit bat, Eidolon helvum LC
Genus: Epomophorus
 Gambian epauletted fruit bat, Epomophorus gambianus LC
Genus: Epomops
 Buettikofer's epauletted fruit bat, Epomops buettikoferi LC
Genus: Hypsignathus
 Hammer-headed bat, Hypsignathus monstrosus LC
Genus: Lissonycteris
 Smith's fruit bat, Lissonycteris smithi LC
Genus: Micropteropus
 Peters's dwarf epauletted fruit bat, Micropteropus pusillus LC
Genus: Myonycteris
 Little collared fruit bat, Myonycteris torquata LC
Genus: Nanonycteris
 Veldkamp's dwarf epauletted fruit bat, Nanonycteris veldkampi LC
Genus: Rousettus
 Egyptian fruit bat, Rousettus aegyptiacus LC
Genus: Scotonycteris
 Zenker's fruit bat, Scotonycteris zenkeri NT
Subfamily: Macroglossinae
Genus: Megaloglossus
 Woermann's bat, Megaloglossus woermanni LC
Family: Vespertilionidae
Subfamily: Kerivoulinae
Genus: Kerivoula
 Copper woolly bat, Kerivoula cuprosa NT
 Lesser woolly bat, Kerivoula lanosa LC
 Spurrell's woolly bat, Kerivoula phalaena NT
Subfamily: Myotinae
Genus: Myotis
 Rufous mouse-eared bat, Myotis bocagii LC
 Welwitsch's bat, Myotis welwitschii LC
Subfamily: Vespertilioninae
Genus: Glauconycteris
 Abo bat, Glauconycteris poensis LC
Genus: Hypsugo
 Broad-headed pipistrelle, Hypsugo crassulus LC
Genus: Mimetillus
 Moloney's mimic bat, Mimetillus moloneyi LC
Genus: Neoromicia
 Cape serotine, Neoromicia capensis LC
 Tiny serotine, Neoromicia guineensis LC
 Banana pipistrelle, Neoromicia nanus LC
 Somali serotine, Neoromicia somalicus LC
 White-winged serotine, Neoromicia tenuipinnis LC
Genus: Pipistrellus
 Tiny pipistrelle, Pipistrellus nanulus LC
Genus: Scotophilus
 African yellow bat, Scotophilus dinganii LC
 White-bellied yellow bat, Scotophilus leucogaster LC
 Nut-colored yellow bat, Scotophilus nux LC
Subfamily: Miniopterinae
Genus: Miniopterus
 Greater long-fingered bat, Miniopterus inflatus LC
 Common bent-wing bat, Miniopterus schreibersii LC
Family: Molossidae
Genus: Chaerephon
 Gland-tailed free-tailed bat, Chaerephon bemmeleni LC
 Lappet-eared free-tailed bat, Chaerephon major LC
 Little free-tailed bat, Chaerephon pumila LC
Genus: Mops
 Sierra Leone free-tailed bat, Mops brachypterus LC
 Angolan free-tailed bat, Mops condylurus LC
 Dwarf free-tailed bat, Mops nanulus LC
 Railer bat, Mops thersites LC
 Trevor's free-tailed bat, Mops trevori VU
Family: Emballonuridae
Genus: Coleura
 African sheath-tailed bat, Coleura afra LC
Genus: Saccolaimus
 Pel's pouched bat, Saccolaimus peli NT
Family: Nycteridae
Genus: Nycteris
 Bate's slit-faced bat, Nycteris arge LC
 Gambian slit-faced bat, Nycteris gambiensis LC
 Large slit-faced bat, Nycteris grandis LC
 Hairy slit-faced bat, Nycteris hispida LC
 Intermediate slit-faced bat, Nycteris intermedia NT
 Large-eared slit-faced bat, Nycteris macrotis LC
 Ja slit-faced bat, Nycteris major VU
 Egyptian slit-faced bat, Nycteris thebaica LC
Family: Rhinolophidae
Subfamily: Rhinolophinae
Genus: Rhinolophus
 Halcyon horseshoe bat, Rhinolophus alcyone LC
 Dent's horseshoe bat, Rhinolophus denti DD
 Rüppell's horseshoe bat, Rhinolophus fumigatus LC
 Guinean horseshoe bat, Rhinolophus guineensis VU
 Hill's horseshoe bat, Rhinolophus hillorum VU
 Lander's horseshoe bat, Rhinolophus landeri LC
 Maclaud's horseshoe bat, Rhinolophus maclaudi EN
 Bushveld horseshoe bat, Rhinolophus simulator LC
 Ziama horseshoe bat, Rhinolophus ziama EN
Subfamily: Hipposiderinae
Genus: Hipposideros
 Aba roundleaf bat, Hipposideros abae NT
 Benito roundleaf bat, Hipposideros beatus LC
 Sundevall's roundleaf bat, Hipposideros caffer LC
 Cyclops roundleaf bat, Hipposideros cyclops LC
 Sooty roundleaf bat, Hipposideros fuliginosus NT
 Giant roundleaf bat, Hipposideros gigas LC
 Jones's roundleaf bat, Hipposideros jonesi NT
 Lamotte's roundleaf bat, Hipposideros lamottei CR
 Aellen's roundleaf bat, Hipposideros marisae EN
 Noack's roundleaf bat, Hipposideros ruber LC

Order: Pholidota (pangolins) 

The order Pholidota comprises the eight species of pangolin. Pangolins are anteaters and have the powerful claws, elongated snout and long tongue seen in the other unrelated anteater species.

Family: Manidae
Genus: Manis
 Giant pangolin, Manis gigantea LR/lc
 Tree pangolin, Manis tricuspis LR/lc

Order: Cetacea (whales) 

The order Cetacea includes whales, dolphins and porpoises. They are the mammals most fully adapted to aquatic life with a spindle-shaped nearly hairless body, protected by a thick layer of blubber, and forelimbs and tail modified to provide propulsion underwater.

Suborder: Mysticeti
Family: Balaenopteridae
Subfamily: Balaenopterinae
Genus: Balaenoptera
 Common minke whale, Balaenoptera acutorostrata VU
 Sei whale, Balaenoptera borealis EN
 Bryde's whale, Balaenoptera brydei EN
 Blue whale, Balaenoptera musculus EN
 Fin whale, Balaenoptera physalus EN
Subfamily: Megapterinae
Genus: Megaptera
 Humpback whale, Megaptera novaeangliae VU
Suborder: Odontoceti
Superfamily: Platanistoidea
Family: Phocoenidae
Genus: Phocoena
 Harbour porpoise, Phocoena phocoena VU
Family: Physeteridae
Genus: Physeter
 Sperm whale, Physeter macrocephalus VU
Family: Kogiidae
Genus: Kogia
 Pygmy sperm whale, Kogia breviceps DD
 Dwarf sperm whale, Kogia sima DD
Family: Ziphidae
Genus: Mesoplodon
 Blainville's beaked whale, Mesoplodon densirostris DD
 Gervais' beaked whale, Mesoplodon europaeus DD
Genus: Ziphius
 Cuvier's beaked whale, Ziphius cavirostris DD
Family: Delphinidae (marine dolphins)
Genus: Orcinus
 Killer whale, Orcinus orca DD
Genus: Feresa
 Pygmy killer whale, Feresa attenuata DD
Genus: Pseudorca
 False killer whale, Pseudorca crassidens DD
Genus: Delphinus
 Short-beaked common dolphin, Delphinus delphis LR/cd
Genus: Lagenodelphis
 Fraser's dolphin, Lagenodelphis hosei DD
Genus: Stenella
 Pantropical spotted dolphin, Stenella attenuata LR/cd
 Clymene dolphin, Stenella clymene DD
 Striped dolphin, Stenella coeruleoalba DD
 Atlantic spotted dolphin, Stenella frontalis DD
 Spinner dolphin, Stenella longirostris LR/cd
Genus: Steno
 Rough-toothed dolphin, Steno bredanensis DD
Genus: Tursiops
 Common bottlenose dolphin, Tursiops truncatus LC
Genus: Globicephala
 Short-finned pilot whale, Globicephala macrorhynchus DD
Genus: Grampus
 Risso's dolphin, Grampus griseus DD
Genus: Peponocephala
 Melon-headed whale, Peponocephala electra DD

Order: Carnivora (carnivorans) 

There are over 260 species of carnivorans, the majority of which feed primarily on meat. They have a characteristic skull shape and dentition.
Suborder: Feliformia
Family: Felidae (cats)
Subfamily: Felinae
Genus: Caracal
 Caracal, C. caracal LC
African golden cat, C. aurata 
Genus: Acinonyx
 Cheetah, Acinonyx jubatus VU
Genus: Leptailurus
 Serval, Leptailurus serval LC
Subfamily: Pantherinae
Genus: Panthera
 Lion, Panthera leo VU
 Leopard, Panthera pardus VU
Family: Viverridae
Subfamily: Viverrinae
Genus: Civettictis
 African civet, Civettictis civetta LC
Genus: Genetta
 Johnston's genet, Genetta johnstoni NT
 Rusty-spotted genet, Genetta maculata LC
Family: Nandiniidae
Genus: Nandinia
 African palm civet, Nandinia binotata LC
Family: Herpestidae (mongooses)
Genus: Herpestes
 Egyptian mongoose, Herpestes ichneumon LC
Genus: Liberiictis
 Liberian mongoose, Liberiictis kuhni VU
Family: Hyaenidae (hyaenas)
Genus: Crocuta
 Spotted hyena, Crocuta crocuta LC
Genus: Hyaena
 Striped hyena, Hyaena hyaena NT
Suborder: Caniformia
Family: Canidae (dogs, foxes)
Genus: Canis
 African golden wolf, Canis lupaster LC
Genus: Lupulella
 Side-striped jackal, L. adusta  
Genus: Lycaon
 African wild dog, Lycaon pictus EN presence uncertain
Genus: Vulpes
 Pale fox, Vulpes pallida LC
Family: Mustelidae (mustelids)
Genus: Ictonyx
 Striped polecat, Ictonyx striatus LC
Genus: Hydrictis
 Speckle-throated otter, Hydrictis maculicollis NT
Genus: Aonyx
 African clawless otter, Aonyx capensis NT

Order: Artiodactyla (even-toed ungulates) 

The even-toed ungulates are ungulates whose weight is borne about equally by the third and fourth toes, rather than mostly or entirely by the third as in perissodactyls. There are about 220 artiodactyl species, including many that are of great economic importance to humans.

Family: Suidae (pigs)
Subfamily: Phacochoerinae
Genus: Phacochoerus
 Common warthog, Phacochoerus africanus LR/lc
Subfamily: Suinae
Genus: Hylochoerus
 Giant forest hog, Hylochoerus meinertzhageni LR/lc
Genus: Potamochoerus
 Red river hog, Potamochoerus porcus LR/lc
Family: Hippopotamidae (hippopotamuses)
Genus: Choeropsis
 Pygmy hippopotamus, C. liberiensis EN
Genus: Hippopotamus
 Hippopotamus, Hippopotamus amphibius VU
Family: Tragulidae
Genus: Hyemoschus
 Water chevrotain, Hyemoschus aquaticus DD
Family: Giraffidae (giraffe, okapi)
Genus: Giraffa
 Giraffe, Giraffa camelopardalis VU extirpated
Family: Bovidae (cattle, antelope, sheep, goats)
Subfamily: Alcelaphinae
Genus: Alcelaphus
 Hartebeest, Alcelaphus buselaphus LR/cd
Subfamily: Antilopinae
Genus: Neotragus
 Royal antelope, Neotragus pygmaeus LR/nt
Genus: Ourebia
 Oribi, Ourebia ourebi LR/cd
Subfamily: Bovinae
Genus: Syncerus
 African buffalo, Syncerus caffer LR/cd
Genus: Tragelaphus
 Lowland bongo, Tragelaphus eurycerus eurycerus LR/nt
 Bushbuck, Tragelaphus scriptus LR/lc
 Sitatunga, Tragelaphus spekii LR/nt
Subfamily: Cephalophinae
Genus: Cephalophus
 Bay duiker, Cephalophus dorsalis LR/nt
 Maxwell's duiker, Cephalophus maxwellii LR/nt
 Blue duiker, Cephalophus monticola LR/lc
 Black duiker, Cephalophus niger LR/nt
 Ogilby's duiker, Cephalophus ogilbyi LR/nt
 Red-flanked duiker, Cephalophus rufilatus LR/cd
 Yellow-backed duiker, Cephalophus silvicultor LR/nt
 Zebra duiker, Cephalophus zebra VU
Genus: Sylvicapra
 Common duiker, Sylvicapra grimmia LR/lc
Subfamily: Hippotraginae
Genus: Hippotragus
 Roan antelope, Hippotragus equinus LR/cd
Subfamily: Reduncinae
Genus: Kobus
 Waterbuck, Kobus ellipsiprymnus LR/cd
 Kob, Kobus kob LR/cd
Genus: Redunca
 Bohor reedbuck, Redunca redunca LR/cd

See also
Wildlife of Guinea

References

External links

Guinea
Guinea
Mammals